Dukat i pribadače is the fourth album of the Croatian rock band Aerodrom, released through Jugoton in 1984. The album is recorded as a trio with the new drummer Nenad Smoljanović. The keyboards were played by Rajko Dujmić of Novi Fosili, who is also the producer of the album. Dukat i pribadače turns the band's sound on a pop rock path and carries three successful singles, "Fratello", "24 sata dnevno", which were released on a 7" record, and "Digni me visoko".

Track listing
All lyrics written by Jurica Pađen, all arrangements by Aerodrom and Rajko Dujmić, except tracks 4, 5 and 6 by Rajko Dujmić.

Personnel 
Aerodrom
Jurica Pađen – Guitars, lead vocals
Remo Cartagine – Bass, acoustic piano in track 11
Nenad Smoljanović – Drums, percussions

Additional musicians
Rajko Dujmić – Keyboards, backup vocals
Vesna Srečković – Backup vocals

Artwork
Vjekoslav Ivezić – Design

Production
Rajko Dujmić – Producer
Vedran Božić - Assistant engineer
Dubravko Majnarić - Executive producer
Recorded by Hrvoje Hegedušić

References

External links
 Official Youtube channel

Aerodrom (band) albums
1984 albums
Jugoton albums